G. Narayanasamy Naidu Kamma  was an Indian politician and former Member of the Legislative Assembly of Tamil Nadu. He was elected to the Tamil Nadu legislative assembly from Mayuram constituency as an Indian National Congress candidate in 1957, and 1962 elections. He was one of the two winners in 1957 election, the other being P. Jayaraj from Congress party. He was elected as an Indian National Congress candidate from Aduthurai constituency in 1952 election.

References 

Indian National Congress politicians from Tamil Nadu
Living people
Year of birth missing (living people)
Madras MLAs 1952–1957
Madras MLAs 1957–1962
Madras MLAs 1962–1967